Johnny Dollar may refer to:

 Yours Truly, Johnny Dollar, a radio drama
 Johnny Dollar (musician) (1933–1986), American country and rockabilly musician
 Johnny Dollar (blues musician) (1941–2006), American Chicago blues guitarist, singer and songwriter
 Jonny Dollar (1964–2009), English record producer and songwriter